The 1945–46 season was the seventh (and last) Scottish football season in which Dumbarton competed in specially arranged wartime football.

Scottish Football League

In what was the last Scottish football season to be played under wartime conditions, the League competition was split into two divisions, with Dumbarton playing in Division B.  Dumbarton finished 8th out of 16 with 26 points - 18 behind champions Dundee. No promotion or relegation resulted from the competition.

League Cup South

The story in the League Cup South was a familiar one, with Dumbarton failing to qualify from their section games.

Supplementary Cup
The Summer Cup was replaced for B Division teams with a Supplementary Cup, and Dumbarton reached the final only to lose out to Airdrie.

Victory Cup
As in 1919, a special Victory Cup was played for, but for Dumbarton there was a first round exit, to Airdrie.

Stirlingshire Cup
The Stirlingshire Cup competition was re-established for the first time since 1939, with Dumbarton falling at the semi final stage to A Division opponents, Falkirk. The competition was however never completed.

Player statistics

|}

Source:

Transfers

Players in

Players out 

Source:

In addition Andrew Bartleman, David Boyd, Tom Brawley, Andrew Cheyne, Frank Douglas, Stan Gullan, James Hoy, Jackie Milne, John Mulvaney, Vincemnt Pritchard and David Watson would all have played their last 1st team game for Dumbarton before the end of the season.

References

Dumbarton F.C. seasons
Scottish football clubs 1945–46 season